House of Stairs (1974) is a science fiction novel by William Sleator about orphaned teenagers placed in a house of stairs, similar to the lithograph print by M. C. Escher, which provided the novel's title and setting, in a 
psychological exploitation of a social dynamics experiment.

Set in a dystopian America in the near future, the story tells of the experiences of five 16-year-olds who were living in orphanages who wake up to find themselves in a strange building that has no walls, no ceiling, and no floor: nothing but endless flights of stairs leading in every direction, seemingly infinite, so that it is impossible to get one's bearings or have perspective. On one landing is a basin of running water that serves as a toilet, sink and drinking fountain; on another, a machine with lights that intermittently produces food. The five, thrown together in these bizarre circumstances, must learn to deal with the others' disparate personalities, the lack of privacy and comfort, their clear helplessness, and a machine that only feeds them under gradually more exacting situations.

Certain episodes in the book suggest a scarcity economy, as the back-story of the characters differs based on apparently socioeconomic criteria. One of the characters validates that the food supply is "real meat...My mother and father...had it once." Another has had access to various goods apparently unavailable to others. Themes include suspicion of authority and social breakdown under stress, similar to William Golding's Lord of the Flies.

The story is told largely from the point of view of Peter, a boy who has been labeled as slightly slow. He tends to follow authority. The others are Lola, a rebellious juvenile delinquent who doesn't trust anyone; Blossom, an overweight, spoiled girl who grew up in pampered wealth but who has recently been orphaned; Oliver, a generous, self-confident, and arrogant athlete who has always been successful and popular; and Abigail, a pretty girl who is shy and kind but is easily misguided, and worries about what others think of her. Peter is in awe of Oliver, who resembles a close friend he once had, but he bonds with Lola, who takes a protective stance toward him from the beginning.

Film adaptation
In 2011, the Vancouver-based production house Zest Productions announced executive Scott G. Hyman (500 Days of Summer) had optioned the movie rights to House of Stairs.  Montreal-based genre writer Doug Taylor was reported to have been hired to adapt the story, and that Hyman, Michael Glassman and Michael Solomon would produce.

As the film was intended to be live action but very VFX heavy, they intended to shoot it in Montreal to take advantage of local tax breaks for live action/CGI hybrids, with packaging to take place in the second half of 2012. However, the project remains listed as "under development" on IMDB, with no further production or release dates.

Notes

External links
 William Sleator's page maintained by his brother Daniel Sleator
 

1974 American novels
American young adult novels
American science fiction novels
1974 science fiction novels
Children's science fiction novels
Novels by William Sleator
E. P. Dutton books